Geoffrey Vernon Ball was one of the first lecturing professors of ophthalmics, pioneering its early inception through the 1950s while  head of Department at Aston University, England. He was appointed the first full-time lecturing precision in ophthalmic optics outside of London. in the 1970's  Ball together with his colleague Michael Wolffe conducted an extensive experience for Aston students in NHS hospitals all over the United Kingdom including Exeter, Cheltenham, Newcastle-upon-Tyne, Bournemouth and Nottingham.

References

Place of birth missing
1926 births
2015 deaths
People from Sutton Coldfield
Academics of Aston University
British optometrists